The tram route 82 in Brussels, Belgium is a tram route operated by the STIB/MIVB, which connects the Berchem-Sainte-Agathe railway station in Sint-Agatha-Berchem to the Drogenbos Castle in the Flemish municipality of Drogenbos. After 8.00pm, the route terminates at Brussels-South railway station, with connections to Drogenbos provided by tram route 32.

Starting from the Berchem railway station, with the terminus on the Place de la Gare/Stationplein, the route runs on the Chaussée de Gand/Gentsesteenweg towards Molenbeek-Saint-Jean, crossing the Avenue Charles Quint/Keizer Karellaan, the Dr. Schweitzer square where the route crosses the tram route 19 and the Boulevard Louis Mettewie/Louis Mettewielaan past the Molenbeek-Saint-Jean cemetery. The route then turns right on the Avenue Brigade Piron/Brigade Pironlaan, crosses the Marie-José park via the Avenue Joseph Baeck/Joseph Baecklaan and then connects with the Brussels Metro at the Gare de l'Ouest/Weststation. The route continues on the Chaussée de Ninove/Ninoofsesteenweg up to the Ninove gate on the small ring road where it enters the municipality of the City of Brussels. It then runs on the small ring road together with the tram route 51 up to the Lemonnier premetro station, where the route enters the North–South Axis tunnel in Saint-Gilles up to the Brussels-South railway station. At this point, the route exits the tunnel and runs on the Avenue Fonsny/Fonsnylaan, then on the Avenue Van Volxem/Van Volxemlaan in Forest, the Chaussée de Bruxelles/Brusselse Steenweg, the Chaussée de Neerstalle/Neerstalle Steenweg past the St. Denis square up to the crossroad with the Rue de Stalle/Stallestraat in the municipality of Uccle. At this crossroad, there is a connection with tram routes 4 and 97. The route 82 then continues on the Rue de l'Etolie/Sterstraat and then leaves the Brussels-Capital Region to enter Drogenbos, where it stops twice before the last stop at the Drogenbos Castle.

See also
List of Brussels tram routes

References

External links
STIB/MIVB official website

82
City of Brussels
Drogenbos
Forest, Belgium
Saint-Gilles, Belgium
Sint-Agatha-Berchem
Molenbeek-Saint-Jean
Uccle